Pierre Ayotte was a French-Canadian soldier and fur trader who served with the Americans during the American Revolutionary War. Ayotte, a habitant from Kamouraska, was equally devoted to the revolutionary cause as Clément Gosselin.

Ayotte and Gosselin were Canadian volunteers who first served with General Richard Montgomery, then went on to become recruiters and agitators on the lower south shore of the Saint Lawrence. Following Montgomery's death at the Battle of Quebec, the two became captains in Colonel Jeremiah Duggan's Canadian regiment. Congress subsequently transferred command of the regiment to Moses Hazen. Ayotte helped to raise troops for the American cause and fought at the Battle of Saint-Pierre. He was captured near Quebec City in May 1776.

In 1783, Congress granted Ayotte land in the Lake Champlain area in recognition of his service.

References 

Continental Army officers from Canada
French Canadians in the American Revolution
French Quebecers
People of pre-Confederation Canada
American spies during the American Revolution